South Tabiteuea is an island council of Kiribati.

References 

Gilbert Islands